Trichura aurifera is a moth in the subfamily Arctiinae. It was described by Arthur Gardiner Butler in 1876. It is found in Pará, Brazil.

References

Arctiidae genus list at Butterflies and Moths of the World of the Natural History Museum

Moths described in 1876
Arctiini